James W. Laine is an American academic and writer notable for his controversial book on the 17th-century Indian king Shivaji, Shivaji: Hindu King in Islamic India.

Background
James Laine is the Arnold H. Lowe Professor of Religious Studies and the chair of the Religious Studies department at Macalester College in Minnesota, United States. He holds a BA (1974) from Texas Tech University, an MTS (1977), and a doctorate in Theology (1984) from Harvard University.

Shivaji: Hindu King in Islamic India
Laine's book, Shivaji Maharaj: Hindu King in Islamic India, contained an offhand comment quoting an anecdote concerning Shivaji's parentage, as part of Laine's discussion of the mysteries of Shivaji's unclear relationship with his father. After publication, four Maratha scholars publicly denounced the book. A hardline Maratha group attacked the Bhandarkar Oriental Research Institute in Pune, India, accusing its high-caste Brahmin scholars as assisting in Laine's so-called slander of Shivaji. In view of the attacks and the public unrest, the book was banned in the state of Maharashtra in January 2004. Filing a petition in the Bombay High Court, James Laine apologized for an offending paragraph on page 93 of the book. Regardless, a warrant was filed for his arrest, and India attempted to have him extradited from the United States.

The publisher Oxford Printing Press promised to delete the paragraph from all future editions of the book,
following which the court lifted the ban in 2007. In July 2010, the Supreme Court of India upheld the lifting of the ban, which was followed by public demonstrations against the author and the decision.

Laine offered a longer analysis of the dispute in 2011. He deplored the attacks on Indian scholars and scholarly institutions which he said had no influence over his choice of tone, but acknowledged that his invocation of a joke was insensitive to Indian caste politics and ought not to be defended as freedom of speech.

Selected works
 (with S. S. Bahulkar)

Notes

References

External links 
Selected Works of James Laine at works.bepress.com
James Laine receives Thomas Jefferson Award in 2017, with a portrait photography

American male writers
Writers from Saint Paul, Minnesota
Living people
Year of birth missing (living people)
Macalester College faculty
Texas Tech University alumni
Harvard Divinity School alumni
Writers about India
Religious studies scholars